Evan Arnold is an American actor who has played Richie Flanscopper on Growing Pains, Gavin Doosler on Just the Ten of Us, Ned Carlson on The West Wing, Jeffrey Ambor on Close to Home, Chef Alan on Suburgatory, Dr. Ditmer on Masters of Sex, and David Hillier in L.A. Noire. He also gained attention for the brief role of Leonard in the series finale of Mad Men.

Arnold is married with two children. His father was Newt Arnold who won a Directors Guild of America Award for his work as assistant director on The Godfather Part II. His mother Judy Arnold was a theatrical producer. He has been a friend of Los Angeles Mayor Eric Garcetti since junior high and is godfather to the mayor's daughter.

Filmography

References

External links 
 

American male television actors
Living people
Place of birth missing (living people)
Year of birth missing (living people)